Ram Prasad Paul (born 1968) is an Indian Politician from Tripura. He is currently serving as Minister of Fire and Emergency Service of Tripura since 2022 in Government of Tripura under Biplab Kumar Deb ministry. He became the MLA from Suryamaninagar Constituency by defeating CPI(M) candidate Rajkumar Choudhury by a margin of 4,567 votes in 2018.

Controversies 
In May 2022, Paul stirred nationwide controversy by wailing and hurling chair while screaming out loud “I will die, I will not (have anything to) do (with) such a party”, over new Chief Minister announcement.

References 

Living people
Tripura MLAs 2018–2023
State cabinet ministers of Tripura
Bharatiya Janata Party politicians from Tripura
1968 births
Tripura MLAs 2023–2028